The 1907 Princeton Tigers football team represented Princeton University in the 1907 college football season. The team finished with a 7–2 record under second-year head coach Bill Roper and outscored its opponents by a total of 282 to 23. Three Princeton players (fullback Jim McCormick, halfback Edwin Harlan, and end Caspar Wister) were selected as consensus first-team honorees on the 1907 College Football All-America Team. Two other Princeton players (quarterback Edward Dillon and a center with the surname Phillips) also received first-team honors from at least one selector.

Schedule

References

Princeton
Princeton Tigers football seasons
Princeton Tigers football